The Lower Township School District is a comprehensive community public school district that serves students in pre-kindergarten through sixth grade from Lower Township, in Cape May County, New Jersey, United States.

As of the 2020–21 school year, the district, comprised of four schools, had an enrollment of 1,519 students and 149.6 classroom teachers (on an FTE basis), for a student–teacher ratio of 10.2:1.

The district is classified by the New Jersey Department of Education as being in District Factor Group "B", the second lowest of eight groupings. District Factor Groups organize districts statewide to allow comparison by common socioeconomic characteristics of the local districts. From lowest socioeconomic status to highest, the categories are A, B, CD, DE, FG, GH, I and J.

The Lower Township School District participates in the Interdistrict Public School Choice Program, which allows non-resident students to attend the district's schools without cost to their parents, with tuition paid by the state. Seats in the program for non-resident students are specified by the district and are allocated by lottery.

For seventh through twelfth grades, public school students attend the schools of the Lower Cape May Regional School District, which also serves students from Cape May City and West Cape May, along with students from Cape May Point who attend the district as part of a sending/receiving relationship. Schools in the district (with 2020–21 enrollment data from the National Center for Education Statistics) are
Richard M. Teitelman Middle School with 480 students in grades 7-8 and
Lower Cape May Regional High School with 750 students in grades 9-12.

History
In 1931, Cape May Point School District closed its only school and began sending students to Lower Township schools. Currently Cape May Point sends to Cape May City Elementary School.

Awards and recognition
Maud Abrams School was recognized by Governor Jim McGreevey in 2003 as one of 25 schools selected statewide for the First Annual Governor's School of Excellence award.

Schools and facilities
Schools in the district (with 2020–21 enrollment data from the National Center for Education Statistics) are:
David C. Douglass Veterans Memorial School with 312 students in grades PreK-K
The school is in the Villas census-designated place. Its building capacity is 529.
Christopher Shivers, Principal
Carl T. Mitnick School with 440 students in grades 1-2
The school is in the Cold Spring community. Its student capacity is 552. The district administration is on the school property, behind the main school building. Additionally the property houses the Lower Township Children's Memorial Garden, which is in honor of students who died. The school was named after Carl T. Mitnick, who donated land to the township. He developed Tranquility Park and did development in North Cape May.
Christina Granero, Principal
Maud T. Abrams School with 355 students in grades 3-4
The school is in the Cold Spring community. Groundbreaking occurred in 1966, and its cost was to be $595,000. Its building capacity is 616.
John King, Principal
Charles W. Sandman Consolidated School with 388 students in grades 5-6
The school is in the Cold Spring community. Its building capacity is 518. 
The Lower Township Consolidated School opened circa 1930. Articles described it as being in Cold Spring, or in Erma. In 1932 a fire destroyed the building, which was described as having ten, or eight rooms. The building was replaced, and in 1949 there were plans to convert a kitchen and an auditorium into classrooms. In 1986 it was renamed after Charles W. Sandman Jr. after all members of the school board agreed to do so.
The district administration was formerly in the Sandman facility. It occupied what the district called a "brown Victorian structure". By 2017 this administration building was demolished.
Van Cathcart, Principal

Administration
Core members of the district's administration are:
Jeff Samaniego, Superintendent
Frank Onorato, Interim Business Administrator / Board Secretary

Board of education
The district's board of education is comprised of nine members who set policy and oversee the fiscal and educational operation of the district through its administration. As a Type II school district, the board's trustees are elected directly by voters to serve three-year terms of office on a staggered basis, with three seats up for election each year held (since 2012) as part of the November general election.

References

External links

School Data for the Lower Township School District, National Center for Education Statistics

Lower Township, New Jersey
New Jersey District Factor Group B
School districts in Cape May County, New Jersey